The women's sanda 52 kilograms competition at the 2014 Asian Games in Incheon, South Korea was held from 20 September to 24 September at the Ganghwa Dolmens Gymnasium.

A total of fourteen competitors from fourteen different countries competed in this event, limited to fighters whose body weight was less than 52 kilograms.

Sanda is an unsanctioned fight is a Chinese self-defense system and combat sport. Amateur Sanda allows kicks, punches, knees (not to the head), and throws.

Zhang Luan from China won the gold medal after beating Elaheh Mansourian of Iran in gold medal bout 2–0 in two rounds, Zhang won both periods by the same score of 5–0. The bronze medal was shared by Kim Hye-bin from South Korea and Yumnam Sanathoi Devi of India after they lost both 2–0 in the semifinals.

Divine Wally from the Philippines, Jharana Gurung from Nepal, Albina Mambetova from Kyrgyzstan and Sangidorjiin Amgalanjargal from Mongolia shared the fifth place. Athletes from Hong Kong, Turkmenistan, Indonesia, Vietnam, Pakistan and Uzbekistan lost in the first round and didn't advance.

Schedule
All times are Korea Standard Time (UTC+09:00)

Results

References

External links
Official website

Women's sanda 52 kg